Onset may refer to:

Onset (audio), the beginning of a musical note or sound
Onset, Massachusetts, village in the United States
Onset Island (Massachusetts), a small island located at the western end of the Cape Cod Canal
Interonset interval, a term in music
Syllable onset, a term in phonetics and phonology
The Onset, Liverpool indie rock group formed by Mike Badger of the La's
 The Onset (album), a 2005 album by the band
, a United States Navy patrol boat in commission from 1917 to 1918
"Onset", a 2019 song by Haiku Hands

See also
 Offset (disambiguation)